Frank Stanley Biela (born 2 August 1964 in Neuss) is a German auto racing driver, mainly competing in touring cars and sportscar racing. He has raced exclusively in cars manufactured by the Audi marque since 1990.

Career 
Biela started his career in 1983 in karting before joining the Ford Youngster Team programme in 1987 alongside Manuel Reuter and Bernd Schneider. He drove for the team in Formula Ford and the Deutsche Tourenwagen Meisterschaft (the German touring car championship), where he won the race at AVUS in 1987. Biela continued to compete in the DTM in 1988, and also raced a limited season in German Formula Three, scoring two wins.

In 1990, he moved to Audi, winning the DTM race at the Nürburgring and the DTM championship in 1991 before Audi left the DTM in mid-season of 1992. Biela stayed with the company, and with the rise of the two-litre Class 2 (Super Touring) rules in other series across Europe, he was entered in various European touring car series over the following few seasons such as the French Supertouring Championship in 1993 driving the Audi 80 (in which he won the championship in) entered by Audi into the championship pairing alongside Marc Sourd. Since his French Supertouring Championship victory in 1993, he is the only standing non-French driver to win it. In 1995, he won the Touring Car World Cup race at Paul Ricard in the new Audi A4, which quickly became one of the dominant touring cars of the mid-1990s.

Biela also competed in the Super Tourenwagen Cup in his native Germany during 1994 and 1995; however his home championship would bring only frustration as in both years he dominated the first half of the season, only for late-season misfortunes to derail his title challenge, losing him the crown to BMW drivers Johnny Cecotto and Joachim Winkelhock respectively. During the AVUS Berlin race in September 1995, Biela's Audi struck Kieth O'dor's already accident-stranded Nissan Primera squarely on the driver's side, fatally injuring O'dor, who died later that day in a Berlin hospital.

For 1996, Audi decided to enter a works team of two A4s in the BTCC. Biela was selected to lead the team; alongside team-mate John Bintcliffe, the new Audi team dominated the competition. Biela comfortably won the title, finishing every single race and being classified in the top ten in all but two races (an 11th-place finish and a disqualification). He also capped an astonishing season by taking first place in the Guia Race of Macau.

Because of the Audis' dominance in 1996, the BTCC organisers imposed a heavy ballast weight "penalty" on all four-wheel-drive cars for the 1997 season. With his Audi badly handicapped by the penalty, Biela initially struggled to make a serious impact. The weight penalty was halved at the midpoint of the season, and results immediately improved to the point where Biela finished second overall to eventual champion Alain Menu. Biela then left Britain to return to the German Super Tourenwagen Cup for 1998, but was largely ineffective. He finished a lowly 14th in the final standings as the A4 (in a new two-wheel-drive racing configuration) became outclassed by rival manufacturers.

In 1999, Biela abandoned touring cars in favour of joining the Audi R8 sports car project, racing under the Audi Sport Team Joest name. It was a good match, and Biela excelled in sportscar racing over the next few seasons, winning several classic events at the wheel of the R8 as well as three ALMS races. The highlight of Biela's time with the R8 team was three successive victories (2000-2002) in the 24 Hours of Le Mans alongside Emanuele Pirro and Tom Kristensen. Audi began to scale back support for the R8 programme after the 2002 season. After winning the ALMS series in 2003, Biela returned to the revamped German touring car series, driving an Audi for Joest Racing (the team which had run Biela's R8 for his three Le Mans wins); the season was not a success.

Biela continued to race an R8 at Le Mans each year with mixed results.  In 2003, he missed the pit lane after just 15 laps and ran out of fuel. He finished 5th and 3rd in 2004 and 2005, respectively.  In December 2005 he participated in the first runs of the new Audi R10 diesel sportscar, the R8's successor. Driving an R10 (again for Team Joest) in the 2006 24 Hours of Le Mans, alongside Pirro and new team-mate Marco Werner, Biela took his fourth victory to date in the classic race. He repeated the victory with the same car and team in 2007.

Honors and awards 
His greatest achievements include winning:
 1991 Deutsche Tourenwagen Meisterschaft German Touring Car Championship with an Audi V8 (he has also finished 2nd and 3rd in DTM)
 1993 French Touring Car Championship
 1995 short-lived Touring Car World Cup one-off race
 1996 BTCC in 1996 (finishing as runner-up the year after)
 1996 Macau Grand Prix Guia Race
 2000, 2001, 2002 24 Hours of Le Mans with an Audi R8
 2006, 2007 24 Hours of Le Mans with an Audi R10
 In a 2005 poll conducted by Motorsport Magazine, Biela was voted 19th best touring car driver ever.

Racing record

Complete Deutsche Tourenwagen Meisterschaft/Masters results
(key) (Races in bold indicate pole position) (Races in italics indicate fastest lap)

† — Retired, but was classified as he completed 90% of the winner's race distance.
  A non-championship one-off race was held in 2004 at the streets of Shanghai, China.

Complete Super Tourenwagen Cup results
(key) (Races in bold indicate pole position) (Races in italics indicate fastest lap)

Complete British Touring Car Championship results
(key) (Races in bold indicate pole position - 1 point awarded all races) (Races in italics indicate fastest lap)

Complete 24 Hours of Le Mans results

Complete 12 Hours of Sebring results

Complete Porsche Supercup results
(key) (Races in bold indicate pole position) (Races in italics indicate fastest lap)

‡ Not eligible for points due to being a guest driver.

Complete Bathurst 1000 results

* Super Touring race

References

External links 

Official Website 

1964 births
Living people
Sportspeople from Neuss
Racing drivers from North Rhine-Westphalia
German racing drivers
German Formula Three Championship drivers
British Touring Car Championship drivers
British Touring Car Championship Champions
Deutsche Tourenwagen Masters drivers
Deutsche Tourenwagen Masters champions
24 Hours of Le Mans drivers
24 Hours of Le Mans winning drivers
American Le Mans Series drivers
Porsche Supercup drivers
24 Hours of Daytona drivers
Rolex Sports Car Series drivers
24 Hours of Spa drivers
Australian Endurance Championship drivers
Team Joest drivers
Audi Sport drivers
Abt Sportsline drivers
Josef Kaufmann Racing drivers
Arena Motorsport drivers
Phoenix Racing drivers
G-Drive Racing drivers
Nürburgring 24 Hours drivers